The list of ship decommissionings in 1960 includes a chronological list of all ships decommissioned in 1960.


References

See also 

1960
 Ship decommissionings
Ship